Brent Owens (born 23 August 1989) is an Australian cook. He is the winner of the sixth series of MasterChef Australia. He gave $50,000 of his $250,000 prize money to fellow contestant Emelia Jackson. He wrote a cook book, Dig In!, for people who come home tired at the end of the day to make a stellar dish with minimal effort. He lives in Melton, Melbourne.

From age 18, Owens worked as a bobcat driver for Ancrum's father's excavation business. Owens bought a house at age 19. He played Australian rules football for the Melton South Football Club in the Ballarat Football League.

After working as a cook, Owens left Australia to pursue a career in biotechnology. He is studying life science at Harvard University and is the co-founder of Vitrafy, a biotech company.

References

External links
 
 http://brentowens.com.au/ 

Living people
Participants in Australian reality television series
Reality cooking competition winners
MasterChef Australia
Australian television chefs
1989 births
Melton South Football Club players
Television personalities from Melbourne
Australian rules footballers from Melbourne
People from Melton, Victoria
Australian expatriates in the United States
21st-century Australian scientists
Scientists from Melbourne
Biotechnologists